Shawn Heflick (born June 17, 1969) is an explorer, adventurer, biologist and current TV host for Python Hunters on National Geographic Wild and is now teaching forensics at the highschool level.

Life and career 
Heflick was born in Akron, Ohio. He grew up on a farm outside of Marion, Ohio and attended Pleasant High School, after moving into a more residential farming community. He graduated in 1987. Wanting to go to college to earn his biology degree, but not having the money for it, Heflick joined military service and volunteered to go to Central America. He enrolled in Wright State University to gain a degree in biology and met his future wife, Jennifer, the first week he was there. He graduated in 1994 and married Jennifer before moving down to Melbourne, Florida to enter graduate school at the Florida Institute of Technology.
 
Heflick gained a SCUBA certification when he was 16. Part of the way through graduate school, Shawn and Jennifer had their son Thorne Ginga Heflick. Heflick left graduate school and took a job at Brevard Zoo as curator until 1998. Heflick left the zoo to once again pursue his graduate degree, which he earned in 2001. Since receiving it, he has worked at several nonprofit conservation NGOs.

Heflick is currently the host for National Geographic Wild's Python Hunters and has appeared on or in National Geographic, PBS Nature, Smithsonian Channel, Travel Channel, Time Magazine, Time Magazine for Kids, Dateline, Nightline, BBC, CNN, ABC, CBS, NBC, as well as newspapers in the US and abroad. Heflick also runs several small businesses including Wildland Tours, Art By Evolution, White Gator Productions and Shawn Heflick Enterprises. Occasionally Heflick also contributes commentary as an animal expert on various local and national news programs.

Heflick and his family live in Florida and have a home in the Amazon Basin of Peru.

References 

 The Python Hunters
 Herpetologist Shawn Heflick Answers Your Questions
 http://www.thirteen.org/pressroom/pdf/nature/season28/PythonsBiosFINAL.pdf
 Time (magazine)
 https://www.pbs.org/wnet/nature/episodes/invasion-of-the-giant-pythons/herpetologist-shawn-heflick-answers-your-questions/5564/
 http://www.cineflixproductions.com/hosts/30-Shawn-Greg-Mike-
 http://boyslife.org/video-audio/21803/shawn-heflicks-favorite-snakes/
 http://www.oln.ca/otherinfo.php?id=110&infoid=69
 http://www.usark.org/uploads/Heflick%20Testimony.pdf
 http://namesdatabase.com/people/HEFLICK/SHAWN/33721871
 http://www.napleschamber.org/news-press/detail.aspx?id=6067
 http://www.wright.edu/email/alumni/newsletter/archives/february2012.html

External links 
 Shawn Heflick's website
 

1969 births
Living people
American television personalities
21st-century American biologists